The 2009 European Canoe Slalom Championships took place at the Holme Pierrepont National Watersports Centre in Nottingham, United Kingdom between May 28 and 31, 2009 under the auspices of the European Canoe Association (ECA). It was the 10th edition.

Medal summary

Men's results

Canoe

Kayak

Women's results

Kayak

Medal table

References
 Official results
 European Canoe Association

European Canoe Slalom Championships
European Canoe Slalom Championships
European Canoe Slalom Championships
European Canoe Slalom Championships
Sport in Nottingham
Canoeing and kayaking competitions in the United Kingdom
Canoeing in England
2000s in Nottingham